Sermersuut Island (old spelling: Sermersût) is an uninhabited island in the Qeqqata municipality in western Greenland.

Geography
{ "type": "ExternalData", "service": "geoshape", "ids": "Q7454979", "properties": { "fill": "#3e614c"}}
The island is located on the shores of Davis Strait, separated from Maniitsoq Island in the south by the Ammarqoq Sound, and from the mainland in the east by the Ikamiut Kangerluarsuat fjord. The island is very mountainous and glaciated in the north, with several distinct mountain peaks.

References

External links
 

Davis Strait
Uninhabited islands of Greenland